The MJHL's nominee for CJHL Player of the Year.  This award has been discontinued by the CJHL.

References
Hockey Canada

Manitoba Junior Hockey League trophies and awards